Abraham Mar Stephanos is the Metropolitan of UK- Europe-Africa Diocese of the Malankara Orthodox Syrian Church.

Early life
Abraham Mar Stephanos was born on 15 August 1969.

Metropolitan
He was elected as the Metropolitan candidate on 25 February 2022 at the Malankara Association held at Kolenchery. He was consecrated as metropolitan on 28 July 2022 at St. Mary's Orthodox Cathedral, Pazhanji.

References

1969 births
Living people
Malankara Orthodox Syrian Church bishops